The Colt Revolving Belt Pistol or Navy Pistol, sometimes erroneously referred to as "Colt Revolving Belt Pistol of Naval Caliber" or "of Navy Caliber" (Naval is heavy gun and Navy Size Caliber was termed later for another Colt model), is a cap and ball revolver that was designed by Samuel Colt between 1847 and 1850. Colt first referred to this Revolver as the Ranger Size model, and then Revolving Belt, but the designation "Navy" quickly took over.

After the Civil War, revolvers using fixed metallic cartridges came into widespread use. The Colt Navy remained in production until 1873, being replaced in the Colt line with what would become one of the manufacturer's most famous handguns, the Colt Single Action Army (also known as the Peacemaker and Colt 45).

Total production numbers of the Colt 1851 Navy Revolver were exceeded only by the Colt Pocket models in concurrent development, and numbered some 215,000 domestic units and about 42,000 produced in the Colt London Armory.

Characteristics
The six-round .36-caliber Navy revolver was much lighter than the contemporary Colt Dragoon Revolvers developed from the .44 Walker Colt revolvers of 1847, which, given their size and weight, were generally carried in saddle holsters. It is an enlarged version of the .31-caliber Colt Pocket Percussion Revolvers, that evolved from the earlier Baby Dragoon, and, like them, is a mechanically improved and simplified descendant of the 1836 Paterson revolver. As the factory designation implied, the Navy revolver was suitably sized for carrying in a belt holster. It became very popular in North America at the time of Western expansion. Colt's aggressive promotions distributed the Navy and his other revolvers across Europe, Asia, and Africa.

The cylinder of this revolver is engraved with a scene of the victory of the Second Texas Navy at the Battle of Campeche on May 16, 1843.  The Texas Navy had purchased the earlier Colt Paterson Revolver, but this was Colt's first major success in the gun trade; the naval theme of the engraved cylinder of the Colt 1851 Navy revolver was Colt's gesture of appreciation. The engraving was provided by Waterman Ormsby. Despite the "Navy" designation, the revolver was chiefly purchased by civilians and military land forces.

Loads consist of loose powder and ball or bullet, metallic foil cartridges (early), and combustible paper cartridges (Civil War era), all combinations being ignited by a fulminate percussion cap applied to the nipples at the rear of the chambers.

A very small number of Navy revolvers were produced in .34 caliber, and are so marked. Another rarity in the 1851 Navy production is the .40-caliber model, only 5 were made in 1858 for testing by the U.S. Navy Bureau of Ordnance.

Identifying features of the First Model Squareback (Serial 1 to ~1250) are the wedge screw beneath the wedge and the wedge notch on top of the cylinder pin (Photo Serial No. 2).  

Sighting consists of a tapered brass cone front sight pressed into the muzzle end of the top barrel flat with a notch in the top of the hammer, as with most Colt percussion revolvers. In spite of the relative crudity of the sighting arrangement, these revolvers and their modern replicas generally are quite accurate.

Colt 1851 Navy conversions
The first metallic cartridge revolver made by Colt was the Thuer-Conversion Model Revolver, a design that would not require a cylinder with cylindrical chambers so as not to infringe on the Rollin White patent. A small number (about 1000–1500) of Model 1851 Navy revolvers were converted, using front-loaded, slightly tapered cartridges to fit the chambers of the cylinder reamed to a slight taper.

After the expiration of the Rollin White patent (April 3, 1869), Colt 1851 (and 1861 Navy) Revolvers were converted or newly made to fire .38 rimfire or centerfire cartridges, the Colt Model 1851 Richards- Mason Conversion by the Colt factory.

Use
Famous "Navy" users included Wild Bill Hickok, William Buffalo Bill Cody, John Henry "Doc" Holliday, Richard Francis Burton, Ned Kelly, Bully Hayes, Ben Pease, Blackbirders, Metis, Seth Kinman, Emir Abdelkader,  Boer Commando, Richard H. Barter, Charlie Goodnight, Robert E. Lee, Nathan B. Forrest, John O'Neill, Frank Gardiner, Ulysses S. Grant, Quantrill's Raiders, Tom Bell, Kootenay Brown, Ivan Turchin, John Coffee "Jack" Hays, "Bigfoot" Wallace, Frederick Townsend Ward, Ben McCulloch, Addison Gillespie, John "Rip" Ford, "Sul" Ross and most Texas Rangers prior to the Civil War.  Use continued long after more modern cartridge revolvers were introduced.

The Ottoman Empire used the revolver as late as the Russo-Turkish War of 1877–78 even though it was quite antiquated compared to the Russians' Smith & Wesson Model 3.

Fictional movie character The Man With No Name also uses a Navy conversion in The Good, the Bad and the Ugly.

References

Bibliography

External links
The Colt Revolver in the American West – Exhibition of Colt revolvers at The Autry Museum
Smithsonian Article on the M1861 Navy
Shooting Characteristics of the M1861 Navy 

American Civil War weapons
Revolvers of the United States
Colt revolvers
Weapons of the Confederate States of America
Single-action revolvers
Black-powder pistols
Early revolvers
Guns of the American West
Weapons of the Russian Empire
Revolvers of the Russian Empire
Weapons of the Ottoman Empire
Victorian-era weapons of the United Kingdom
Texas Ranger Division
Police weapons
Military revolvers
Revolvers of the United Kingdom